Hard Ground is a 2003 Western TV movie directed by Frank Q. Dobbs and starring Burt Reynolds and Bruce Dern. It is the last film directed by Dobbs. The cinematography was made by Maximo Munzi.

Cast

Reception
The Movie Scene said the film "does come up very short and at times the forced story elements makes it almost laughable."

References

External links
 
 
 

American Western (genre) films
Films directed by Frank Q. Dobbs
Films scored by Joe Kraemer
Sonar Entertainment films
Larry Levinson Productions
Hallmark Channel original films
GoodTimes Entertainment
Films shot in California
2000s American films